Intermezzo (also called Intermezzo: A Love Story) is a 1939 American romantic film remake of a 1936 Swedish film of the same title. It stars Leslie Howard as a married virtuoso violinist who falls in love with his accompanist, played by Ingrid Bergman in her Hollywood debut. The film was directed by Gregory Ratoff and produced by David O. Selznick. It features multiple orchestrations of Heinz Provost's title piece, which won a contest associated with the original film's production. The screenplay by George O'Neil was based on that of the original film by Gösta Stevens and Gustaf Molander. It was produced by Selznick International Pictures.

The score by Lou Forbes was nominated for an Academy Award, and music credit was given to Robert Russell Bennett, Max Steiner, Heinz Provost and Christian Sinding. The cinematography by Gregg Toland, who replaced Harry Stradling, was also nominated.

Plot
Holger Brandt, a celebrated virtuoso violinist, meets Anita Hoffman, his daughter's piano instructor, during a trip home. Impressed by Anita's talent, he invites her to accompany him on his next tour. They begin touring together and a passionate relationship ensues. Holger's wife Margit asks him for a divorce.

Knowing how much Holger misses his daughter Ann Marie and son Eric, and torn with guilt for breaking up his family, Anita decides to pursue her own career and leaves Holger. Holger returns home to see his children again. He first travels to Ann Marie's school, but as she runs across the street to greet him, she is hit by a car in front of his eyes. He takes the injured Ann Marie back home and confronts his angry son in an attempt to explain his infidelity.

To Holger's relief, the doctor informs him that Ann Marie will survive and eventually recover from her injuries. Margit then forgives Holger and welcomes him back into his family.

Cast
 Leslie Howard as Holger Brandt
 Ingrid Bergman as Anita Hoffman
 Edna Best as Margit Brandt
 John Halliday as Thomas Stenborg
 Cecil Kellaway as Charles Moler, The Impresario
 Enid Bennett as Greta Stenborg
 Ann E. Todd as Ann Marie Brandt (as Ann Todd)
 Douglas Scott as Eric Brandt
 Eleanor Wesselhoeft as Emma, The Maid
 Marie Flynn as Marianne

Production

The musical duets with Howard and Bergman were dubbed for the soundtrack by professional musicians; however, the actors' hands show the actual music being played. Bergman plays the full piano parts (for Edvard Grieg's Concerto in A minor and Christian Sinding's "Rustle of Spring"), so her hand positions are correct for the music soundtrack. Howard could not play the violin, so a professional violinist named Al Sack, who bore a striking resemblance to Howard, was brought in to teach him proper violin posture and bowing technique. During filming, Sack rested on his knees, out of view of the camera, and did the fingering on all of the closeups. In the film, Sack's left hand is shown along with Howard's bowing arm and profile. Sack also doubled for Howard during the long shots in front of the orchestra.

Accolades
The film is recognized by American Film Institute in these lists:
 2002: AFI's 100 Years...100 Passions – Nominated

Radio adaptations and remake
Bergman was heard in a radio adaptation of Intermezzo on Lux Radio Theater on January 29, 1940, with Herbert Marshall, and again on June 4, 1945 with Joseph Cotten. On October 5, 1946, Marshall starred in an adaptation of Intermezzo on the Hollywood Star Time radio program.

The film was remade as Honeysuckle Rose in 1980.

Notes

External links
 
 
 
 
 
 Intermezzo on Lux Radio Theater: June 4, 1945

1939 films
American black-and-white films
American remakes of Swedish films
Films directed by Gregory Ratoff
Selznick International Pictures films
United Artists films
1939 romantic drama films
Films about classical music and musicians
Films about violins and violinists
American romantic drama films
Films produced by David O. Selznick
Films scored by Max Steiner
1930s English-language films
1930s American films